Woman of Tehuantepec, also known as Aztec Woman of Tehuantepec, is an outdoor 1935 fountain and sculpture by Donal Hord, installed in the courtyard of Balboa Park's House of Hospitality, in San Diego, California.

See also
 1935 in art

References

External links
 

1935 establishments in California
1935 sculptures
Balboa Park (San Diego)
Fountains in California
Outdoor sculptures in San Diego
Sculptures of women in California
Statues in San Diego